Kirchbach in Steiermark is a former municipality in the district of Südoststeiermark in the Austrian state of Styria. Since the 2015 Styria municipal structural reform, it is part of the municipality Kirchbach-Zerlach.

Population

References

Cities and towns in Südoststeiermark District